Badir Shoukri (born 20 August 1926) is an Egyptian former sports shooter. He competed in the trap event at the 1968 Summer Olympics.

References

External links

1926 births
Possibly living people
Egyptian male sport shooters
Olympic shooters of Egypt
Shooters at the 1968 Summer Olympics
Sportspeople from Cairo